Shu Chun Teng (12 December 1902 – 1 May 1970), also abbreviated as S. C. Teng, was a Chinese mycologist.

Early life
Born in Min County of Fuzhou, Teng graduated from Tsinghua University in 1923.

He went on to continue his studies in America, returning to China with a master's degree he had obtained at Cornell University in 1928.

Occupation and work
In 1945 he went to Shanghai and set up the Forest Exological Research Centre. Since 1949, he served as assistant director and vice president of Shenyang Agricultural University, and then in 1955 he served in the same previously stated post in Northeast Agricultural College. He was a researcher and deputy director of the Institute of Microbiology of Chinese Academy of Sciences since 1955, member of the Department of Biology in the Chinese Academy of Sciences.

References

Chinese mycologists
Cornell University alumni
Educators from Fujian
People from Fuzhou
Scientists from Fujian
Tsinghua University alumni
1902 births
1970 deaths